ʻAbd al-Raḥīm (ALA-LC romanization of ) is a male Muslim given name, and in modern usage, surname. It is built from the Arabic words ʻabd, al-Raḥīm, one of the names of God in the Qur'an, which give rise to the Muslim theophoric names. It means "servant of the merciful".

Because the letter r is a sun letter, the letter l of the al- is assimilated to it. Thus, although the name is written in Arabic with letters corresponding to Abd al-Rahim, the standard pronunciation corresponds to Abd ar-Rahim. Alternative transliterations include Abdel Raheem, Abdur Raheem, Abdul Rahiem and other regional linguistic variations, and subject to variant spacing or hyphenation.

It may refer to:

Given name
Abd al-Rahim ibn al-Husain al-'Iraqi (1325–1403), Shafi'i scholar of hadith
Abdul Rahim Khan-I-Khana (1556–1627), Indian poet
Abdur Rahim (judge) (1867–1952), Indian judge and politician
Abdurrahim bey Hagverdiyev (1870–1933), Azerbaijani playwright, stage director and politician
Abd al-Rahim al-Hajj Muhammad, (1892-1939), Palestinian commander of the 1936–39 Arab revolt in Palestine
Abdurrahim Hojibayev (1900–1938), Tajik politician in the Soviet Union
Abdul Rahim (Indian politician) (1902–1977), member of the Indian National Congress
Abdurrahim Buza (1905–1987), an Albanian painter
Abdur Rahim (scholar) (1918-1986), a Muslim scholar and politician of the Bangladesh Jamaat-e-Islami.
Abdulrahim Abby Farah (1919–2018), Somali diplomat
Abdul Rahim Khan (1925–1990), Commander-in-Chief of the Pakistan Air Force
Abdul Rahim Hatef (1926–2013), Afghan politician
Abdul Rahim Sarban (1930–1993), Afghan singer, known as "Sarban"
Abdul Rahim Malhas (1937–2012), Jordanian politician
Abdul Rahim Nagori (1939–2011), Pakistani painter
Abdul Rahim Wardak (born 1940 (?)), Afghan politician
Abdul Rahim Mourad (born 1942), Lebanese politician
Abed Elrahim Abu Zakrra (1943–1989), Sudanese writer, poet, and translator
Abdel Rahim Mohammed Hussein (born 1949), Sudanese politician
Abdurrahim El-Keib (born 1950), Libyan electrical engineer turned politician
Wan Abdul Rahim Wan Abdullah (born 1952), Malaysian politician
Abdolrahim Mousavi (born 1960), Iranian general
Abdul Rahim Muslimdost (born 1960), Pakistani journalist and jeweler held in Guantanamo
Abdul Rahim Bakri (born 1961), Malaysian politician
Abdul-Rahim Hamed Aufi (born 1963), Iraqi footballer
Abd al-Rahim al-Nashiri (born 1965), Saudi held in Guantanamo
Abdul Al-Rahim Ghulam Rabbani (born 1969), Pakistani held in Guantanamo
Abderrahim Ouakili (born 1970), Moroccan footballer
Abderrahim Zitouna (born 1970), Moroccan runner
Abderrahim El Haouzy (born 1975), Moroccan-French runner
Abdul Rahim (Guantanamo detainee 549) or Omar Said Salim Al Dayi
Abdul Rahim (Guantanamo detainee 897) (born c. 1975), Afghan
Abderrahim Goumri (born 1976), Moroccan runner
Abderrahim Chkilit (born 1976), Moroccan footballer
Abdul Rahim Shapiee (1977–2022), Singaporean drug trafficker
Abd Al Rahim Abdul Rassak Janko (born 1978), Syrian Kurd held in Guantanamo
Abdulrahim Jumaa (born 1979), UAR footballer
Abderrahim Essaidi (born 1983), Moroccan footballer
Abdulrahim Kerimbakiev (born 1983), Kazakh held in Guantanamo
Abderrahim Najah (born 1984), Moroccan basketball player
Abderrahim Zhiou (born 1985), Tunisian Paralympic athlete
Abdul Rahim Ayew (born 1988), Ghanaian footballer
Abdulrahim Jaizawi (born 1989), Saudi footballer
Abdulrahim Abdulhameed (born 1990), Bahraini Taekwondo practitioner
Abdul Rahim Ghafoorzai (died 1997), Afghan politician and diplomat
Abdur Rahim (general) (died 2021), Bangladeshi Brigadier General and director general of NSI
Abdul Raheem Glailati, Sudanese poet and journalist
Abdurrahim Al Murbati, Bahraini held in extrajudicial detention in Saudi Arabia
Abdul Rahim (Afghan politician), Afghan Communications Minister of the Interim Administration
Abderahim Mechenouai, Algerian boxer
Abd al-Rahim al-Hasini, Iraqi politician

Middle or surname
Abubakar Abdul Rahim (1920–1995), Indian politician
Behzod Abdurahimov (born 1990), Uzbek pianist
Besart Abdurahimi (born 1990), Croatian footballer
Chaudhry Abdul Rahim, Pakistani politician
Fathi Tawfiq Abdulrahim (born 1970), Yemeni politician
Gamal Abdel-Rahim (1924–2000), Egyptian classical music composer
Jalaludin Abdur Rahim (1913–1977), Bengali Pakistani communist politician
Khalid Abdul Rahim (born 1962), Bahraini businessman
Manaf Abd al-Rahim al-Rawi (died 2013), Iraqi accused of terrorism
Mirza Abdul'Rahim Talibov Tabrizi (1834—1911), Iranian Azerbaijani intellectual and social reformer
Muhadhdhabuddin Abd al-Rahim bin Ali bin Hamid al-Dimashqi, known as Al-Dakhwar (1170–1230), Syrian physician in Ayyubid Egypt
Nabil Omran Abdul-Rahim (born 1981), Libyan futsal player
Ramadan Abdel Rehim Mansour (c. 1980–2010), Egyptian criminal
Shaaban Abdel Rahim (1957–2019), Egyptian popular singer
Shah Abdur Rahim (1644–1719), 17th century Indian Sufi and scholar and he most sensible person of his time  
Shareef Abdur-Rahim (born 1976), American basketball player and NBA executive
Sheikh Abdur Rahim (1859–1931), Bengali author
Mouni Abderrahim (born 1985), Algerian volleyball player

References

Arabic masculine given names